Hans Heiniger (born 1940/1941) is a Swiss football coach who has managed a number of teams in Africa.

Career
Heiniger has coached in the Gambia, Tunisia, Burkina Faso, Mali and Madagascar.

He coached the Gambian national team between 1987 and 1992, their first ever foreign manager.

In Mali he managed Djoliba AC, leading them to 2nd place in the Malian Première Division, before being sacked in August 2000. In August 2002 he became the new manager of the Madagascar national side. He left the position in July 2003, and was replaced by Rodolphe Rakotoarisoa.

References

1940s births
Living people
Swiss football managers
Gambia national football team managers
Djoliba AC managers
Madagascar national football team managers
Swiss expatriate football managers
Swiss expatriate sportspeople in the Gambia
Expatriate football managers in the Gambia
Swiss expatriate sportspeople in Tunisia
Expatriate football managers in Tunisia
Swiss expatriate sportspeople in Burkina Faso
Expatriate football managers in Burkina Faso
Swiss expatriate sportspeople in Mali
Expatriate football managers in Mali
Swiss expatriate sportspeople in Madagascar
Expatriate football managers in Madagascar